Imman Annachi (born 13 May 1970) is an Indian actor, television presenter, politician and comedian  who has appeared in character roles in various Tamil films.

Career
Imman Annachi made his debut hosting a show named Konjam Arattai Konjam Settai telecasted in Makkal TV. Imman Annachi made his breakthrough in Solluganne Sollunga on Adithya TV before moving on to work on the children's TV show Kutty Chutties on Sun TV.

He has done small roles in several films, some of which include Neerparavai (2012), Maryan (2013), Naiyaandi (2013), Goli Soda (2014), Madras (2014) and Kayal (2014). Some of his best-known works are Jilla (2014),  Poojai (2014), Kakki Sattai (2015) and Puli (2015).

He got popularity in 2021 as he participated in Bigg Boss(Tamil season 5) as an original contestant and was praised for his humour sense in that show. But he also received hatred for his male chauvinistic attitude towards all the woman in the house especially Isaivani. He was one of the most stayed old contestant after Cheran, Vaiyapuri and Dhadi Balaji. He was eliminated on Day 70 from the house despite having many fans.

Politics 
Imaan Annachi joined DMK in April 2016 under the leadership of Kalaingar. He campaigned for the party for 2021 elections in Tamil Nadu.

Filmography

Films

Short films
"Please Close The Door" (2012)

Television

References

External links
 

Living people
21st-century Indian male actors
Male actors in Tamil cinema
Television personalities from Tamil Nadu
Tamil comedians
1968 births
Bigg Boss (Tamil TV series) contestants